Milesina is a genus of fungi belonging to the family Pucciniastraceae.

The genus has cosmopolitan distribution.

Species

Species:

Milesina andina 
Milesina arisanense 
Milesina asplenii-incisi

References

Pucciniales
Basidiomycota genera